War Goddess (also known as The Amazons and The Bare-Breasted Warriors) is a 1973 adventure film directed by Terence Young and starring Alena Johnston, Sabine Sun, Rosanna Yanni, Helga Liné, and Luciana Paluzzi. It was a co-production between Italy (where it was released as Le guerriere dal seno nudo), France (where it is known with the title Les amazones), and Spain (where is it is known as Las amazonas).

Plot
  
Set nearly three thousand years ago, the Amazons are a tribe of proud warrior women, who have seceded from the rest of the world, and set up a state purely composed of their own sex. The film opens with the tribe holding a tournament of various physical contests to select a new queen. In the final competition, man-hating Antiope defeats her longtime rival Oreitheia in a wrestling match and is crowned queen. The new ruler believes the tribe has gone soft and imposes a rigid discipline that allows sexual relations with men only once a year to procreate. Antiope also wants a return to a more egalitarian society, which doesn't sit well with Oreitheia and many of the other high Amazons, and she hatches various schemes to eliminate Antiope and take her place on the throne.

Since there are no men in the tribe, the Amazons hire men from another nation once a year for reproductive purposes; an "unpleasant but necessary" ordeal which Antiope herself also dutifully participates in. The Amazons soon go to meet a group of Greek soldiers led King Theseus of Athens for their annual mating ceremony. Meanwhile, Oreitheia and her loyal followers attempt to undermine the queen's rule by slipping an aphrodisiac in her water, only for her handmaiden to drink it instead and suffer the effects. Curious about of the Amazons, Theseus pretends to be a low-ranking captain and has sex with Antiope, impregnating her in the process. Much to the queen's dismay, she quite enjoys her first time having sex with a man. The next day, during a series of contests held between the two groups, Antiope attempts to one-up Theseus in a show jumping competition after he attempts to impress her. This results in the queen injuring her leg and is left unable to perform in bed the following night. Theseus meets with Antiope to apologize for showing off and attempts to change her man-hating ways, but her resolve remains quite firm. Secretly worried that she has feelings for Theseus and being perceived as weak, Antiope orders the Amazons to depart for home a day early.  
     
The king recommends to the queen a certain way back to their home through the Blue Mountains, inadvertently sending the tribe into a Scythian ambush. Realizing his mistake, Theseus assembles a garrison of soldiers to aid the Amazons as they are attacked, and they drive off the Scythians. Believing that the Greeks deliberately set them up, the Amazons mount an expedition lead by Oreitheia to pillage the villages of the Scythians in retaliation. During the following months, Theseus has become smitten with the queen and sets up a makeshift camp near the Amazon's city. At one time covertly saving her from an assassination attempt and later sneaks into her bedchambers to make love to her again, the latter which she reluctantly accepts. Theseus also sends his wife Queen Phaedra to the city under the guise of a feminist representative from Crete, in order to learn more about the Amazon's matriarchal society. Suspicious of Phaedra's true motivations, Antiope followers her back to Theseus's campsite and discovers his deception. Seeing him with another women causes Antiope to believe the Theseus was merely using her and she angrily breaks off their relationship, making future plans for revenge. With their cover blown, Theseus and Phaedra return to Athens for the time being.

The time finally comes for the queen to give birth, but to her sadness the child is a boy and is left out to die as male children are not wanted by the Amazons. The apparent loss of her son causes Antiope to become conflicted and later more outspoken when Oreitheia's war party returns successful from their campaign against the Scythians. This in turn causes Antiope to lose some support among her fellow Amazons. Taking advantage of the political turmoil, Oreitheia attempts to murder Antiope in her sleep, but the queen anticipates her betrayal and catches her by spear point. Deciding that they need to settle their dispute once and for all, the two Amazons engage in a nude wrestling match as a thunderstorm rages outside. Exhausted from their lengthy struggle, they end up falling into each other's embrace and become lovers.

Antiope arranges for another meeting with the Greeks to mate again and then kill them all in revenge for their perceived role in setting up the ambush. Despite grim predictions from their priests that the mission will result in heavy losses, Oreitheia encourages Antiope to go through with it. Antiope and Theseus are finally reunited at the camp, where he confesses his love for her. After they're finished making love, Theseus reveals that he already knew about the assassination in advance thanks to some treacherous Amazons. The king also tells her that he had rescued their son (now named Hippolytus) and she slips out of the tent with him to go see her child in Athens. The other Amazons think she's been kidnapped, with only Oreitheia and few others realizing the truth, and chase after the Greeks to prevent word of this great dishonor from spreading. The Amazons eventually catch up and have a battle with the Greeks. To keep Antiope out of harms way, Theseus orders his men to tie her to the carriage against her will. As the conflict ensues, both side suffer casualties and Antiope can only watch helplessly as Oreitheia is killed on the battlefield. Deciding that there has been enough bloodshed, Theseus calls for the fighting to stop. In the aftermath of the battle, Antiope recognizes Oreitheia's desire to become queen, and places the ring symbolizing her status as queen on her finger. Having been conquered by the Greeks, Antiope and the survivors join them on the long journey back to Athens. Though disheartened that both she and the Amazons as a whole are now ruined, Antiope looks forward to her future role as Theseus's political advisor and is pleasantly surprised to find out that Phaedra is his first wife, not his lover.

Cast
Alena Johnston: Antiope
Sabine Sun: Oreitheia
Rosanna Yanni: Penthesilea
Helga Liné: High Priestess
Rebecca Potok: Melanippe
Malisa Longo: Leuthera 
Lucy Tiller: Alana
Almut Berg: Cynara
Luciana Paluzzi: Phaedra
Angelo Infanti: Theseus
Fausto Tozzi: General
Benito Stefanelli: Commander
Ángel del Pozo: Captain
Franco Borelli: Perithous

References

External links

1973 films
1970s fantasy films
Films directed by Terence Young
Sword and sorcery films
Films based on classical mythology
1970s feminist films
Italian LGBT-related films
Spanish LGBT-related films
French LGBT-related films
Films scored by Riz Ortolani
Films shot in Almería
Phaedra
Cultural depictions of Theseus
Films about male prostitution
Amazons in art
Scythians
1970s English-language films
Films with screenplays by Luciano Vincenzoni
1970s Italian films
1970s French films